Dale Wayne Schlueter (November 12, 1945 – July 24, 2014) was an American professional basketball player born in Tacoma, Washington.

A 6'10" center from Colorado State University, Schlueter was selected by the San Francisco Warriors in the sixth round of the 1967 NBA draft and by the Houston Mavericks in the 1967 ABA Draft.

Schlueter played in the National Basketball Association from 1968 to 1978 as a member of the San Francisco Warriors, Portland Trail Blazers, Philadelphia 76ers, Atlanta Hawks, Buffalo Braves, and Phoenix Suns. He averaged 5.3 points and 5.2 rebounds over his career. He died of cancer on July 24, 2014.

Notes

External links
 

1945 births
2014 deaths
Atlanta Hawks players
Basketball players from Tacoma, Washington
Buffalo Braves players
Centers (basketball)
Colorado State Rams men's basketball players
Houston Mavericks draft picks
Philadelphia 76ers players
Phoenix Suns players
Portland Trail Blazers expansion draft picks
Portland Trail Blazers players
San Francisco Warriors draft picks
San Francisco Warriors players
American men's basketball players